The Northern Territory Minister for Environment and Natural Resources is a Minister of the Crown in the Government of the Northern Territory. The minister administers their portfolio through the Department of Environment and Natural Resources.

The Minister is responsible for Aboriginal carbon and water policy, biodiversity conservation and assessment, climate change, the conservation of pastoral land, environmental protection and sustainability, environment strategy and policy, environmental assessment, environmental compliance and enforcement, land and water resources assessment and management, pastoral land administration, rural bushfire management, strategic direction on environmental matters, volunteer bushfire management and weed management. This also includes responsibility for the Northern Territory Environment Protection Authority.

The Minister for Environment and Natural Resources also has responsibilities for Aboriginal sacred sites, and oversees the Aboriginal Areas Protection Authority (AAPA).

The current minister is Eva Lawler (Labor). The ministry was expanded at that time to include the responsibilities of the formerly distinct Land Resource Management ministry.

List of Ministers for Environment and Natural Resources

Climate Change

Former posts

Land Resource Management

See also 
 Minister for the Environment and Water (Australia)
 Minister for the Environment (Victoria)
 Minister for Environment (Western Australia)
 Minister for Environment and Heritage

References

Northern Territory-related lists
Ministers of the Northern Territory government